Wedmore First School Academy is a first school academy in Wedmore, Somerset, for students aged 4–9, with a nursery for children from age 2. It has a total capacity of 210 pupils and a current enrollment of 201.

The school was founded in 1876, moved to its present site in 1990, upgraded to academy status in 2011 and became part of the Wessex Learning Trust in 2016.

History 
Wedmore First School was founded in 1876 on Cheddar Road, Wedmore, before moving to its current location. It became an academy, directly funded by central government, in 2011, and joined the Wessex Learning Trust group of schools in 2016.

In March 2017, former Somerset County Cricket Club wicketkeeper Jos Buttler opened four new £500,000 classrooms at the school, after the proposed expansion was greenlit by the Department for Education.

In July 2019, Avon and Somerset Police's Speed Enforcement Unit released details regarding mobile speed cameras outside the school.

Headteachers

Notable students 
 Jos Buttler, vice-captain of the England cricket team

References

External links 
 Official website
 WLT page

Academies in Somerset
Educational institutions established in 1876
1876 establishments in England
Primary schools in Somerset